Isaac Alarcón García (born July 27, 1998) is a Mexican professional American football offensive tackle for the Dallas Cowboys of the National Football League (NFL). He played college football at the Monterrey Institute of Technology (ITESM) and joined the Cowboys in 2020 as a part of the league's International Player Pathway Program.

Early years
Alarcón first started playing football at age 14 years old at Club Pumas, a youth football club, then attended the UANL High School No. 9 in Monterrey, Mexico. He accepted a football scholarship from the Monterrey Institute of Technology and Higher Education (ITESM). He played as a right and left tackle. In 2019, he contributed to ITESM winning the Mexican college football national championship.

In 2016, he was on the Mexico national team that earned a bronze medal in the U19 World Championship in China.

Professional career
Alarcón was allocated to the Dallas Cowboys on April 27, 2020. He is part of the NFL's International Player Pathway Program that allowed him to train for two months alongside NFL players and draft hopefuls at the IMG Academy after being selected from an international combine held in Germany in October 2019. He was waived on September 5, 2020, and signed to the practice squad the next day. He signed a reserve/future contract with the Cowboys on January 4, 2021.

On August 31, 2021, Alarcón was waived by the Cowboys and re-signed to the practice squad the next day.

Alarcón was drafted by the Calgary Stampeders in the third round of the 2021 CFL Global Draft on April 15, 2021.

His roster exemption was kept for the 2021 season. He signed a reserve/future contract with the Cowboys on January 18, 2022.

On August 30, 2022, Alarcón was waived by the Cowboys and signed to the practice squad the next day.

References

External links
Dallas Cowboys bio

Further reading

1998 births
Living people
Mexican players of American football
American football offensive tackles
Borregos Salvajes Monterrey players
Dallas Cowboys players
Mexican expatriate sportspeople in the United States
Sportspeople from Monterrey
International Player Pathway Program participants
Expatriate players of American football